The 2010–11 Israeli Noar Leumit League was the seventeenth season since its introduction in 1994. It is the top-tier football in Israel for teenagers between the ages 18–20. It began on 21 August 2010 and ended on 28 May 2011.

Maccabi Tel Aviv won the title, whilst Bnei Sakhnin and Hapoel Ramat Gan were relegated.

League table

References

External links
Israel Football Association

 

Israeli Noar Premier League seasons
Noar Leumit League